Rhomboarctus is a genus of tardigrades in the family Styraconyxidae. The genus was named and first described by Renaud-Mornant in 1984.

Species
The genus includes three species:
 Rhomboarctus aslaki Hansen, Gallo D’Addabbo & de Zio Grimaldi, 2003
 Rhomboarctus duplicicaudatus Hansen, Gallo D’Addabbo & de Zio Grimaldi, 2003
 Rhomboarctus thomassini Renaud-Mornant, 1984

References

Further reading
 Renaud-Mornant, 1984 : Halechiniscidae (Heterotardigrada) de la campagne Benthedi, Canal du Mozambique. [Halechiniscidae (Heterotardigrada) of the Benthedi Fields, Mozambique Channel] Bulletin of the Muséum National d'Histoire Naturelle Section A, Zoology, Biology and Animal Ecology, vol. 6, no 1, p. 67-88.

Tardigrade genera
Styraconyxidae